John Warden Arthur Robertson (15 February 1940 – 24 February 2001) was an Australian rules footballer who played with Hawthorn and Richmond in the Victorian Football League (VFL).

Robertson retired at the age of 25 to concentrate on his business career and subsequently served as a director of the Richmond Football Club.

Notes

External links 

1940 births
2001 deaths
Australian rules footballers from Victoria (Australia)
Hawthorn Football Club players
Richmond Football Club players
People educated at Carey Baptist Grammar School